is an American-born kickboxer and mixed martial artist who currently resides in Japan. He currently competes in the super welterweight division of RISE, where he is the former RISE welterweight champion, as well as in the lightweight division of Rizin FF.

Kickboxing career

J-NETWORK
BeyNoah made his professional debut against Shunsuke Iwata at J-KICK 2016～Honor the fighting spirits～2nd on May 5, 2016. He won the fight by a second-round knockout. Two months later, it was announced that BeyNoah would participate in the J-NETWORK Welterweight Rookies Cup. He was booked to face Hiroki Saiga in the tournament semifinals, which were held at J-FIGHT & J-GIRLS 2016 4th on July 31, 2016. He won the fight by a second-round knockout. He advanced to the semifinals, held at J-KICK 2016～Honor the fighting spirits～3rd on October 10, 2016, where he met Toshiyuki Ohara. BeyNoah won the fight by unanimous decision, after an extra round was contested.

BeyNoah was booked to face Masato Nagai at J-NEXUS 2016～DAY～	on December 25, 2016. He won the fight by a second-round knockout, stopping Nagai with a left hook at the 2:02 minute mark. BeyNoah was next booked to face Ikki Takeichi at J-FIGHT 2017～J-NETWORK 20th Anniversary～ 1st on March 12, 2017. He won the fight by a first-round technical knockout, stopping his opponent after just 26 seconds. 

His run of form earned BeyNoah the right to fight the #1 ranked J-Network welterweight contender Yusaku Fujikura for the vacant Welterweight title. The bout was scheduled for J-KICK 2017～J-NETWORK 20th Anniversary～3rd and took place on August 20, 2017. He won the fight by a fifth-round technical knockout. The bout was stopped on the advice of the ringside physician, due to a cut above Fujikura's left eyebrow.

RISE

Early RISE career
BeyNoah made his promotional debut with RISE against Masashi Nakajima at RISE 122 on February 4, 2018. He won the fight by a third-round knockout. He won the fight by a third-round knockout.

BeyNoah was scheduled to face Ji Hwan Yang at RISE 125 on June 17, 2018. He won the fight by a first-round flying knee knockout.

BeyNoah faced Akio Kashima at RISE EVOL.1 on September 21, 2018. The fight was stopped at the 2:07 minute mark of the opening round, after BeyNoah successfully knocked Kashima down three times.

RISE welterweight champion
BeyNoah was booked to face Daiki Watabe for the vacant RISE Welterweight Championship at RISE 129 on November 17, 2018. He won the fight by a dominant unanimous decision, with scores of 50–45, 50–45 and 50–44.

BeyNoah faced the former WBC champion Tapruwan Hadesworkout in a non-title bout at RISE World Series 2019 First Round on March 10, 2019. He lost the fight by a first-round knockout. BeyNoah rebounded from his first professional loss with a unanimous decision victory against Tomo Kiire at RISE 133 on July 5, 2019. He was then scheduled to rematch Tapruwan Hadesworkout at RISE World Series 2019 Final Round on September 16, 2019. BeyNoah avenged his first career loss by unanimous decision, after an extra round was fought.

BeyNoah faced the Shootboxing super lightweight and REBELS super welterweight champion Kaito Ono at SHOOT BOXING GROUND ZERO TOKYO 2019	on December 3, 2019. He lost the fight by unanimous decision, with scores of 50–48, 49–48 and 49–48.

BeyNoah made his first RISE welterweight title defense against the #1 ranked RISE welterweight contender Hideki at RISE 137 on February 23, 2020. He won the fight by unanimous decision, with scores of 49–47, 50–47 and 50–47.

BeyNoah faced Tsukuru Midorikawa at RISE 140 on July 19, 2020. He lost the fight by unanimous decision.

BeyNoah faced Hiromitsu Miyagi at RISE DEAD OR ALIVE 2020 Yokohama on October 11, 2020. He won the fight by a third-round head kick knockout.

BeyNoah faced Yuya at RISE Eldorado 2021 on February 28, 2021. He won the fight by unanimous decision, after an extra round was fought.

BeyNoah faced Negimajin at RISE WORLD SERIES 2021 Yokohama on September 23, 2021. He won the fight by unanimous decision.

In February 2022, BeyNoah vacated the RISE welterweight title in order to move up in weight.

Move up in weight
BeyNoah was booked to face Kaito Ono in a 71.5 kg catchweight bout at RISE El Dorado 2022 on April 2, 2022. The bout was a rematch of their December 3, 2019 fight, which Kaito won by unanimous decision. He lost the fight by first round knockout.

BeyNoah faced the reigning K-1 Super Welterweight champion Hiromi Wajima in a non-title bout at The Match 2022 on June 19, 2022. He lost the fight by unanimous decision, with all three judges scoring the bout 30–24 for Wajima, as he managed to knock BeyNoah down in every round of the fight.

Mixed martial arts career
BeyNoah made his mixed martial arts debut against Satoshi Yamasu, in a 73kg catchweight bout, at Rizin 28 – Tokyo on June 16, 2021. He lost the fight by split decision.

BeyNoah was booked to face Daryl Lokoku at Rizin 32 – Okinawa on November 20, 2021. He won the fight by a third-round knockout.

BeyNoah made his lightweight debut against Koji Takeda at Rizin 33 on December 31, 2021. Takeda won the fight by a second-round submission.

Beynoah faced Sho Patrick Usami at Rizin 40 on December 31, 2022. He lost the fight by a first-round knockout.

Titles and accomplishments

Kickboxing
Professional
J-NETWORK
 2016 J-NETWORK Welterweight Rookies Cup Winner
 2017 J-NETWORK Welterweight Championship 

RISE
 2018 RISE Welterweight Championship 
 One successful title defense

Amateur
 2015 Peter Aerts Spirit −70kg Tournament Winner

Karate
IKO Kyokushinkaikan
 2012 All Japan High School Championships Middleweight runner-up
 2014 Josai Cup runner-up
 2016 All Japan Open Best Rookie Award
 2017 All Japan Weight Championships Lightweight runner-up
 2018 All Japan Weight Championships Lightweight Winner

Mixed martial arts record

|-
|Loss
|align=center|1–3
|Sho Patrick Usami
|KO (punch)
|Rizin 40
|
|align=center|1
|align=center|0:45
|Saitama, Japan
|-
|Loss
|align=center|1–2
|Koji Takeda
|Submission (armbar)
|Rizin 33
|
|align=center|2
|align=center|4:12
|Saitama, Japan
|-
| 
| align=center| 1–1
| Daryl Lokoku	
| KO (punch)
| Rizin 32 – Okinawa
| 
| align=center|3
| align=center|1:09
| Okinawa, Japan
| 
|-
| 
| align=center| 0–1
| Satoshi Yamasu	
| Decision (split)
| Rizin 28 – Tokyo
| 
| align=center|3
| align=center|5:00
| Tokyo, Japan
| 
|-

Kickboxing record

|-  style="text-align:center; background:#fbb"
| 2022-06-19 || Loss ||align=left| Hiromi Wajima || THE MATCH 2022 || Tokyo, Japan || Decision (Unanimous)|| 3 ||3:00
|-  style="background:#fbb;"
| 2022-04-02|| Loss ||align=left| Kaito || RISE El Dorado 2022 || Tokyo, Japan || KO (Left hook) || 1 ||0:41 
|-  style="text-align:center; background:#cfc;"
| 2021-09-23|| Win ||align=left| Negimajin || RISE WORLD SERIES 2021 Yokohama || Yokohama, Japan || Decision (Unanimous) || 3 || 3:00

|-  style="text-align:center; background:#cfc;"
| 2021-02-28|| Win||align=left| Yuya|| RISE Eldorado 2021||  Yokohama, Japan || Ext.R Decision (Unanimous) || 4 || 3:00

|-  style="text-align:center; background:#cfc;"
| 2020-10-11|| Win||align=left| Hiromitsu Miyagi || RISE DEAD OR ALIVE 2020 Yokohama||  Yokohama, Japan || KO (Left High Kick) || 3 || 0:55

|- style="text-align:center; background:#fbb;"
| 2020-07-19|| Loss||align=left| Tsukuru Midorikawa || RISE 140|| Tokyo, Japan || Decision (Unanimous) || 3|| 3:00

|- style="text-align:center; background:#cfc;"
| 2020-02-23|| Win||align=left| Hideki || RISE 137|| Tokyo, Japan || Decision (Unanimous) || 5|| 3:00
|-
! style=background:white colspan=9 |

|- style="text-align:center; background:#fbb;"
| 2019-12-03|| Loss ||align=left| Kaito ||SHOOT BOXING GROUND ZERO TOKYO 2019|| Tokyo, Japan || Decision (Unanimous) || 5|| 3:00

|- style="text-align:center; background:#cfc;"
| 2019-09-16|| Win||align=left| Tapruwan Hadesworkout || RISE World Series 2019 Final Round|| Tokyo, Japan || Ext.R Decision (Unanimous) || 4|| 3:00

|- style="text-align:center; background:#cfc;"
| 2019-07-05|| Win||align=left| Tomo Kiire || RISE 133|| Tokyo, Japan || Decision (Unanimous) || 3|| 3:00

|- style="text-align:center; background:#fbb;"
| 2019-03-10|| Loss||align=left| Tapruwan Hadesworkout|| RISE World Series 2019 First Round|| Japan || KO (Left Hook) || 1|| 2:10

|- style="text-align:center; background:#cfc;"
| 2018-11-17|| Win||align=left| Daiki Watabe  || RISE 129|| Tokyo, Japan || Decision (Unanimous) || 5|| 3:00
|-
! style=background:white colspan=9 |

|- style="text-align:center; background:#cfc;"
| 2018-09-21|| Win||align=left|  Akio Kashima  || RISE EVOL.1|| Tokyo, Japan || TKO (3 Knockdowns) || 1|| 2:07

|- style="text-align:center; background:#cfc;"
| 2018-06-17|| Win||align=left| Ji Hwan Yang  || RISE 125|| Chiba, Japan || KO (Flying Knee) || 1|| 2:18

|- style="text-align:center; background:#cfc;"
| 2018-03-24|| Win||align=left| Yuya  || RISE 123|| Tokyo, Japan || Decision (Unanimous) || 3|| 3:00

|- style="text-align:center; background:#cfc;"
| 2018-02-04|| Win||align=left| Masashi Nakajima  || RISE 122|| Tokyo, Japan || KO (Right Cross) || 3|| 0:48

|- style="text-align:center; background:#cfc;"
| 2017-08-20|| Win||align=left| Yusaku Fujikura  || J-KICK 2017～J-NETWORK 20th Anniversary～3rd|| Tokyo, Japan || TKO (Doctor Stoppage) || 5|| 0:50
|-
! style=background:white colspan=9 |

|- style="text-align:center; background:#cfc;"
| 2017-03-12|| Win||align=left| Ikki Takeichi || J-FIGHT 2017～J-NETWORK 20th Anniversary～ 1st|| Tokyo, Japan || TKO (Doctor stoppage) || 1|| 0:26

|- style="text-align:center; background:#cfc;"
| 2016-12-25|| Win||align=left| Masato Nagai  || J-NEXUS 2016～DAY～|| Tokyo, Japan ||KO (Right Hook) || 2|| 2:02

|- style="text-align:center; background:#cfc;"
| 2016-10-10|| Win||align=left| Toshiyuki Ohara  || J-KICK 2016～Honor the fighting spirits～3rd, Welterweight Rookies Cup Final|| Tokyo, Japan ||Ext.R Decision (Unanimous) || 4|| 3:00
|-
! style=background:white colspan=9 |

|- style="text-align:center; background:#cfc;"
| 2016-07-31|| Win||align=left| Hiroki Saiga  || J-FIGHT & J-GIRLS 2016 4th, Welterweight Rookies Cup Semi Final|| Tokyo, Japan ||KO (Left Hook) || 2|| 1:25

|- style="text-align:center; background:#cfc;"
| 2016-05-05|| Win||align=left| Shunsuke Iwata  || J-KICK 2016～Honor the fighting spirits～2nd || Tokyo, Japan ||KO || 2|| 1:13
|-
| colspan=9 | Legend:

See also
 List of male kickboxers

References

Living people
1995 births
Japanese male mixed martial artists
American male mixed martial artists
Mixed martial artists utilizing kickboxing
Mixed martial artists utilizing Kyokushin kaikan
Mixed martial artists utilizing judo
Japanese male kickboxers
American male kickboxers
Japanese male karateka
American male karateka
American male judoka
Japanese male judoka
Sportspeople from Torrance, California